The women's 59 kg competition at the 2019 World Weightlifting Championships was held on 20 and 21 September 2019.

Schedule

Medalists

Records

Results

New records

References

Results 

Women's 59 kg
2019 in women's weightlifting